Habanero-tan is the unofficial mascot of Bōkun Habanero, the habanero pepper-flavored snacks produced by Tohato. Habanero-tan and her companions with names like "Jalapeño-san" are the personification of spices as cute young girls. They were created by several Japanese amateur artists, and of them, Shigatake, the creator of the character Habanero-tan, drew a series of yonkoma manga featuring the lives of these girls. Shigatake later became the graphics designer for the Vanillaware games Odin Sphere and GrimGrimoire.

Habanero-tan's popularity has led to various renditions (some of them risque) by other Japanese artists, and even appearances on the OVA Netrun-mon. There is also a dōjin game called Habanero-tan House which incorporates many of the things seen in Shigatake's comics. The game's creator, Ashinaga Oji-san, later worked with Shigatake and Vanillaware to develop a similar game called Kumatanchi for the Nintendo DS.

Characters

An energetic young girl with a red dress and red hair, and a stem on her head. Created by Shigatake.

Habanero's friend and older sister figure. Created by Shima Humikane.

Habanero's friend and milk supply. Has large breasts and wears skimpy clothes. Created by Salad Oil.

References

External links
Official Tohato Habanero page
Shigatake's homepage – includes collected translations of the comics into Korean, English and Polish.
Long-legged Uncle (Ashinaga Oji-san) – creator of "Habanero-tan House"

Food advertising characters
Female characters in advertising
Moe anthropomorphism